Theo van Wijngaarden (27 February 1874, Rotterdam – 4 November 1952, Voorburg) was a Dutch art forger.

Van Wijngaarden was born in Rotterdam and later lived in The Hague.

Associated often with fellow art forger Han van Meegeren, van Wijngaarden was a lesser artist whose legitimate income came largely from restoration, working with cheaply purchased pictures and moving them to other areas of Europe to sell for a profit. He worked on several of van Meegeren's forgeries, including Frans Hals and Smiling Girl, a painting once thought to be a work of Dutch painter Johannes Vermeer, akin to his Girl with a Pearl Earring and donated by collector Andrew W. Mellon to the National Gallery of Art in Washington, D.C. in 1937. Van Wijngaarden often served as the front man, making the sales deals on van Meegeren's forgeries.

Literature 
 Jonathan Lopez: The Man Who Made Vermeers. Unvarnishing the Legend of Master Forger Han van Meegeren. Orlando, Harcourt Inc., 2008.

Notes

1874 births
1952 deaths
Art forgers
Dutch fraudsters
Painters from Rotterdam
20th-century Dutch painters
20th-century Dutch criminals
Dutch male painters
Conservator-restorers
20th-century Dutch male artists